Brejakovići is a village in the municipality of Sokolac, Bosnia and Herzegovina.

References

s

Populated places in Sokolac